Lorentz Tovatt (born 1989) is a Swedish politician. From February 2021 to September 2022, he served as Member of the Riksdag representing the constituency of Stockholm Municipality.

References

External links 
 

Living people
1989 births
Place of birth missing (living people)
Members of the Riksdag from the Green Party
Members of the Riksdag 2018–2022
21st-century Swedish politicians